{{Infobox album
| name       = Rap Game Awful
| type       = mixtape
| artist     = Clavish
| cover      = Clavish - Rap Game Awful.jpeg
| alt        =
| released   = 
| recorded   = 
| studio     =
| genre      = 
| length     = 89:32
| label      = 
 Polydor
 Universal Music UK
| producer   = 
 Aifo
 AyeTM
 Chek Beatz
 Disco
 Elyas
 Eugene Tsai
 The FaNaTiX
 GO Beatz
 Hal
 HARGO
 Harry Beech
 Hazey Just Landed
 HD Beats
 Hoskins
 ID Crysis
 JJ Beatz
 Joe Reeves
 Kazza
 Kieran Nash
 Kyle Evans
 Lia Liza
 M1OnTheBeat
 Mack Jamieson
 Madz Thomas
 Makenobeats
 Nick French
 ODZZ
 Off & Out
 Omar Guetfa
 Prince Galalie
 R14 Beats
 Simon Crisp
 SK the Plug
 svdominik
 TN 490
 Two Inch Punch
| prev_title = 2022'
| prev_year  = 2021
| next_title = 
| next_year  = 
| misc         = 
}}Rap Game Awful is the debut mixtape by British rapper Clavish. It was released through Polydor Records and Universal Music UK on 13 January 2023. The mixtape features guest appearances from D-Block Europe, Fredo, Frosty, Rimzee, Tiny Boost, Youngs Teflon, Tiggs da Author, MoStack, Teeway, Kirky, Jordan, and Kaash Paige.Rap Game Awful was supported by six singles: "Greece", "Public Figure", "NRF Freestyle", "Rocket Science" featuring D-Block Europe, "Traumatised", and "No Difference".

Release and promotion
On 19 May 2022, Clavish released the mixtape's lead single, "Greece." The song proceeded to peak at number 70 on the UK Singles Chart. The mixtape's second single "Public Figure" was released on 22 September 2022. It proceeded to peak at #66 on the Official UK Charts. The mixtape's third single "NRF Freestyle" was released on 16 October 2022. 

On 15 November 2022, through Instagram, Clavish announced the release of the mixtape alongside him previewing the tracklist with features such as Frosty, D-Block Europe, Fredo, Rimzee, Tiny Boost, Youngs Teflon, Tiggs da Author, MoStack, Teeway, Kirky, Jordan, and Kaash Paige. 

The D-Block Europe-assisted "Rocket Science" was released on 17 November 2022, as the mixtape's fourth single; the success of the song marked Clavish's highest charting single at #9 on the Official UK Charts. 

On 3 December 2022, Clavish announced a UK tour which would see him in vastly populated cities such as Birmingham, Dublin, Glasgow, London, and Manchester. A week later, another London date was added due to the tour's high demand.

The mixtape's fifth single "Traumatised" was released on 5 January 2023, just over a week prior to its release. A day before the release, on 12 January 2023, the mixtape's sixth and final single "No Difference" was released.

Tour

On December 3, 2022, Clavish announced the Rap Game Awful Tour, a 4-date United Kingdom concert tour, in support of the album, beginning March 20, 2023, at Dublin Green Room in Dublin, and concluding March 28, 2023, at O2 Academy Islington in London. Due to popular demand, five more shows were added. After being edited, the tour would start on March 13, 2023, at the Trinity Centre in Bristol and would conclude on March 28, 2023, at O2 Academy Islington in London.

Shows

Critical receptionRap Game Awful received positive reviews from music critics. Fred Garratt-Stanley from NME notes that "Clavish peppers an eclectic range of beats with clear, cutting, confessional verses." He follows up on this by stating "the tape is a lingering sense of darkness; his stories of prison, gang crime, and betrayal are given an extra bite by ominous, yet stripped-back instrumentals that offer Clavish space to bar and echo the murkiness of early drill heavyweights like 67 and Harlem Spartans." Concluding his review, Garratt-Stanley notes that "the powerful sense of emotion echoed across Rap Game Awful is what makes the mixtape so memorable" and that "If he learns to refine his output a little, there’s no reason Clavish can’t achieve the levels of stardom he’s been tipped to reach." Damien Morris from The Observer noted that "the north London rapper has been carefully nurtured for success over the past two years." He concluded his review as he wrote "the chill, sparse productions foreground Clavish’s economical delivery beautifully, as he flirts with imploring vulnerability and vicious querulousness without ever committing to either." Writing for The Guardian'', Alexis Petridis states that "his worldview is strikingly drawn and bleak, devoid of politicking, expressions of anger at societal injustice or indeed optimism." This is followed by Petridis noting that "all this is rendered in a genuinely skilled and original voice, the subtle idiosyncrasies of his flow pointed up by the guest appearances." He concluded his review as he wrote, "he’s abundantly talented, a singular and austerely powerful voice."

Track listing

Notes
  signifies an additional producer
  signifies a co-producer

Sample credits
 "Traumatised" contains a sample of "Thong Song" as performed by Sisqó, written by Mark Andrews, Draco Rosa, Bob Robinson and Tim Kelley.

Personnel
Musicians

 Clavish – vocals (all tracks)
 R14 Beats – drum programming (3)
 Frosty – vocals (7)
 Young Adz – vocals (9)
 Dirtbike LB – vocals (9)
 Rimzee – vocals (11)
 Tiny Boost – vocals (11)
 Youngs Teflon – vocals (11)
 Tiggs Da Author – vocals (14)
 Two Inch Punch – bass (14)
 Two Inch Punch – synthesizer (14)
 Mack Jamieson – guitar (14)
 TN 490 – programming (14)
 MoStack – vocals (15)
 Teeway – vocals (18)
 Kirky – vocals (21)
 AyeTM – Drums (21)
 AyeTM – rhythm arranger (21)
 JJ Beatz – bass (23)
 JJ Beatz – drums (23)
 Jordan – vocals (24)
 Kaash Paige – vocals (26)

Technical

 Eli Crossan – assistant mixing (6)
 Lilian Nuthall – assistant mixing (6)
 Dante “PR” Vicens – recording (9)
 Matt Colton – mastering (2, 6, 9, 12)
 LiTek – mixing (12)
 Henri Davies – recording (14)
 Nick French – recording (14)
 Jake Jones – recording (5, 11, 15)
 Prince Galalie – recording (16)
 Manon Grandjean – mixing (2, 9, 20)
 Matt Doughty – mixing (22)
 Jeremy Cooper – mastering (22)
 Manon Grandjean – mixing (2-5, 7-11, 13-15, 17, 19-21, 23, 24)
 Nathan Boddy – mixing (1, 6, 16, 18, 25-28)
 Stuart Hawkes – mastering (1, 3-5, 7, 8, 10, 11, 13-21, 23-28)
 Benjamin Stokes – recording (3, 5-8, 10, 13, 14, 17-23, 26-28)

Charts

References

2023 mixtape albums
Polydor Records albums